St. Mary's Hospital was a Catholic hospital founded in 1866 by the Sisters of Charity of the Incarnate Word in Galveston, Texas, United States;  it was the first private hospital in Texas.  The hospital was closed and sold in 1996 to the neighboring University of Texas Medical Branch.

See also
CHRISTUS Health

References

Catholic hospitals in North America
History of Galveston, Texas
Healthcare in Galveston, Texas
Hospitals established in 1866
Defunct companies based in Texas
Defunct hospitals in Texas
Companies disestablished in 1996
Hospitals disestablished in 1996
1866 establishments in Texas
Catholic health care